NGC 7073 is a spiral galaxy located about 230 million light-years away in the constellation of Capricornus. NGC 7073 was discovered by astronomer Albert Marth on August 25, 1864.

See also 
 List of NGC objects (7001–7840)
 NGC 7019

References

External links 

Spiral galaxies
Capricornus (constellation)
7073
66847
Astronomical objects discovered in 1864